Zhou Yafei (born 1984-01-17 in Qingdao, Shandong) is a Chinese swimmer, who competed for Team China at the 2008 Summer Olympics.

Major achievements
2002 Asian Games - 1st 100m fly/4 × 100 m medley relay;
2003 World Championships - 3rd 200m individual medley/1st 4 × 100 m medley relay;
2003 World Military Games - 1st 50m fly/100m fly/200m free/4 × 100 m free relay/4 × 100 m medley relay;
2004 Olympic Games - 4th 4 × 100 m medley relay;
2005 National Games - 1st 100m fly/4 × 100 m medley relay;
2005 East Asian Games - 1st 100m fly/4 × 100 m medley relay;
2006 World Short-Course Championships - 3rd 4 × 100 m medley relay;
2006 Asian Games - 1st 100m fly/4 × 100 m medley relay;
2007 World Military Games - 1st 50m fly/100m fly/4 × 100 m free relay/4 × 100 m medley relay;
2008 Beijing Olympics - 3rd 4 × 100 m medley relay;
2009 World Aquatics Championships - 2nd 50m butterfly

Records
2003 World Championships - 26.71, 50m fly (AR);
2006 National Championships - 26.30, 50m fly (AR)/58.32 100m fly (AR);
2006 National Championships - 2007 World Championships - 58.20, 100m fly (AR)

Personal life
Zhou Yafei married basketball player Mo Ke in 2012.

References

External links
 

1984 births
Living people
Chinese female butterfly swimmers
Chinese female medley swimmers
Olympic bronze medalists for China
Olympic swimmers of China
Swimmers from Qingdao
Swimmers at the 2008 Summer Olympics
Olympic bronze medalists in swimming
Chinese female freestyle swimmers
World Aquatics Championships medalists in swimming
Medalists at the FINA World Swimming Championships (25 m)
Asian Games medalists in swimming
Swimmers at the 2002 Asian Games
Swimmers at the 2006 Asian Games
Medalists at the 2008 Summer Olympics
Asian Games gold medalists for China
Asian Games silver medalists for China
Asian Games bronze medalists for China
Medalists at the 2002 Asian Games
Medalists at the 2006 Asian Games
20th-century Chinese women
21st-century Chinese women